Soissons is a commune in the northern French department of Aisne, in the region of Hauts-de-France. Soissons is also the see of an ancient Roman Catholic diocese, whose establishment dates from about 300, and it was the location of a number of church synods called "Council of Soissons".

History
Soissons enters written history under its Celtic name, later borrowed into Latin, Noviodunum, meaning "new hillfort", which was the capital of the Suessiones. At Roman contact, it was a town of the Suessiones, mentioned by Julius Caesar (B. G. ii. 12). Caesar (B.C. 57), after leaving the Axona (modern Aisne), entered the territory of the Suessiones, and making one day's long march, reached Noviodunum, which was surrounded by a high wall and a broad ditch. The place surrendered to Caesar.

From 457 to 486, under Aegidius and his son Syagrius, Noviodunum was the capital of the Kingdom of Soissons, until it fell to the Frankish king Clovis I in 486 after the Battle of Soissons.

Part of the Frankish territory of Neustria, the Soissons region, and the Abbey of Saint-Médard, founded in the sixth century, played an important political part during the rule of the Merovingian dynasty (447–751). After the death of Clovis I in 511, Soissons was made the capital of one of the four kingdoms into which his states were divided. Eventually, the kingdom of Soissons disappeared in 613 when the Frankish lands were amalgamated under Chlothar II.

The 744 Council of Soissons met at the instigation of Pepin the Short and Saint Boniface, the Pope's missionary to pagan Germany, secured the condemnation of the Frankish bishop Adalbert and the missionary Clement of Ireland.

During the Hundred Years' War, French forces committed a notorious massacre of English archers stationed at the town's garrison, in which many of the French townsfolk were themselves raped and killed. The massacre of French citizens by French soldiers shocked Europe; Henry V of England, noting that the town of Soissons was dedicated to the saints Crispin and Crispinian, claimed to avenge the honour of the saints when he met the French forces at the Battle of Agincourt on Saint Crispin's Day 1415. The town was liberated by French troops under the command of Joan of Arc on July 23, 1429.

Between June 1728 and July 1729 it hosted the Congress of Soissons an attempt to resolve a long-standing series of disputes between the Kingdom of Great Britain and Spain which had spilled over into the Anglo-Spanish War of 1727–1729. The Congress was largely successful and led to the signing of the Treaty of Seville between them.

During World War I, the city came under heavy bombardment. There was mutiny after the disastrous Chemin des Dames offensive at the Second Battle of the Aisne. A statue erected with images of French soldiers killed in action in 1917 is behind the St Peter's Church, next to the Soissons Courthouse.

Sights
Today, Soissons is a commercial and manufacturing centre with the 12th century Soissons Cathedral, the ruins of St. Jean des Vignes Abbey and the cypt of the former abbey of Saint-Médard as three of its most important historical sites. The nearby Espace Pierres Folles contains a museum, geological trail, and botanical garden.

Landmarks

Cathédrale Saint-Gervais-et-Saint-Protais de Soissons is constructed in the style of Gothic architecture. The building of the south transept was begun about 1177, and the lowest courses of the choir in 1182. The choir with its original three-storey elevation and extremely tall clerestory was completed in 1211. This was earlier than Chartres, on which the design was supposed to have been based. Work then continued into the nave until the late 13th century.

Abbey of Notre Dame – The former abbey of Notre Dame, former royal abbey, founded in the Merovingian era, famous for its rich treasure of relics, including the "shoe of the Virgin." The abbey was prestigious abbesses like Gisèle, sister of Charlemagne, or Catherine de Bourbon, aunt of Henry IV.
Saint-Médard Abbey – The Saint-Médard Abbey was a Benedictine monastery of Soissons whose foundation went back to the sixth century. Today, only the crypt remains.
Hôtel de ville – Since 1833 the city hall has been housed in a chateau built by architect Jean-François Advyné between 1772 and 1775 at the request of the Intendant Pelletier Mortefontaine on the site of a previous one belonging to the counts of Soissons.
Arsenal – Exhibition space in the arsenal of the former Abbey of St. Jean des Vignes
Passerelle des Anglais – The "Passerelle des Anglais" (literally: "Footbridge of the English") is a concrete footbridge over the Aisne in the center of the city. The original bridge was destroyed in 1914. It was rebuilt by British soldiers, after which it was known as the "Pont des Anglais" ("Bridge of the English"). Destroyed again during World War II, it was rebuilt in 1950 as a  pedestrian bridge.
The covered market – Built in 1908 by architect Albert-Désiré Guilbert (1866–1949)

Personalities
 The actress Aurore Clément was born in Soissons in 1945.
 The artist Emmanuel Fillion was born in Soissons in 1966. 
 The saints Crispin and Crispinian were martyred c. 286 at Soissons for preaching Christianity to the local Gauls.
 The 6th century Burgundian king Guntram was born in Soissons around 532.
 Jeanne Macherez (1852–1930), heroine during World War I; Mayor of Soissons

Population

See also
 Battle of Soissons
 Communes of Aisne
 Franks
 List of Frankish kings
 Merovingians
 Suessiones
 Vase of Soissons
 Wolf of Soissons
 Sessions (surname)

References

External links

 Official website 
 Catholic Encyclopedia: Soissons
 A live view of the port of Soissons
 Discovering Soissons 
 Soissons Powerlifting club (English) 
 Local Bus Routes

Communes of Aisne
Capitals of former nations
Subprefectures in France
Suessiones
Gallia Belgica
Aisne communes articles needing translation from French Wikipedia